Ashland County Courthouse may refer to:

Ashland County Courthouse (Ohio)
Ashland County Courthouse (Wisconsin)